Hypovoria is a genus of flies in the family Tachinidae.

Species
Hypovoria cauta (Townsend, 1926)
Hypovoria dentata Richter, 1980
Hypovoria discalis (Brooks, 1945)
Hypovoria hilaris (Villeneuve, 1913)
Hypovoria pilibasis (Villeneuve, 1922)

References

Dexiinae
Tachinidae genera
Diptera of Europe
Diptera of North America
Diptera of Asia
Diptera of Africa
Taxa named by Joseph Villeneuve de Janti